Elizabeth Norman is an American author and historian. Her work focuses on nurses and the role of women in military history.

Biography 

Norman earned a Ph.D. and M.A. from New York University and a B.S. from Rutgers University. She is a registered nurse. Norman has served as director of the doctoral program at New York University's Division of Nursing in the School of Education.

As an author, Norman has made significant contributions to the field of women's military history. Her work brings to light the often-neglected experiences of women during wartime. Her first book, Women at War, examines the previously untold experience of fifty women who served as nurses during the Vietnam War. Her second book, We Band of Angels, is based on interviews with female nurses who were held captive by the Japanese for three years in Bataan, Philippines during World War II. Norman was the first to speak to these women, known as the Angels of Bataan, about the tragedy they endured.  She described the experience of conducting these interviews as, "women talking candidly about women swept up in a lethal enterprise of men." Her third book, Tears in the Darkness, is a history of the Bataan Death March and the American, Filipino, and Japanese combatants who were involved.
 
Her inspiration to write about military nurses came from her experience as a nurse as well as the fact that both her mother and husband have served in the U.S. military.

Works

Reception 
We Band of Angels was well received and has been reviewed by forty American newspapers, such as the New York Times and Washington Post. The Publishers Weekly review of the book read, "[Norman] captures moments of great courage...but the true highlights come in the evocation of tears and sweat that went into the nurses daily struggle."

Her book Tears in the Darkness, co-written with her husband Michael Norman, was listed number nine on the New York Times Best Sellers list for non-fiction in July 2009. The New York Times said of the book, "'Tears of Darkness' is a book about heroism and survival...If you aren't weeping openly by the book's final scenes...then you have a hard crust of salt around your soul."

Awards 
 Rutgers Living History Society's Stephen E. Ambrose Oral History Award, 2011
 Dayton Literary Peace Prize for Tears in the Darkness, 2010
 Lavinia Dock Award for historical scholarship
 American Academy of Nursing National Media Award
 Agnes Dillon Randolph Award

References

External links 

 Review of We Band of Angels from Biographile 
 Review of We Band of Angels from Publishers Weekly
 New York Times Review of Tears in Darkness

Living people
American military historians
Military history of the United States
American women writers
New York University alumni
Rutgers University alumni
American nursing administrators
American women historians
Year of birth missing (living people)
21st-century American women